Current use:
BBC Radio London, the BBC's local station for London

Radio London may historically refer to:
A popular name for the BBC World Service in Nazi-occupied Europe during World War II
Radio Londres, broadcasts made by the Free French Forces via the BBC during World War II
Wonderful Radio London, also known as "Radio London" and The "Big L", an offshore pirate radio station
The original name of Big L 1395